Sarıköy is a village in the İdil District of Şırnak Province in Turkey. The village is populated by Assyrians and had a population of 53 in 2021.

Information 
Sarıköy is an Assyrian Syriac Orthodox village of fourteen clans and historically under the patronage of the Kurdish Salihan tribe. Some families consider themselves Salihan. During the 20th century after Sayfo, a large part of its population migrated to Germany with some families returning in recent years.

There were 180 speakers of Turoyo in the village in 1984.

References 

Villages in İdil District
Assyrian communities in Turkey